Argyresthia altissimella is a moth of the  family Yponomeutidae. It is found in North America, including Colorado.

The wingspan is about 12 mm.

References

Moths described in 1877
Argyresthia
Moths of North America